Hicham Ouladha (born 31 January 1995) is a Moroccan runner who specializes in the 1500 metres.

He won the bronze medal at the 2017 Jeux de la Francophonie, finished ninth at the 2018 African Championships and fifth at the 2019 African Games. He also became Moroccan champion in 2018 and 2019.

His personal best time is 3:35.35 minutes, achieved in July 2018 in Rabat.

References

1995 births
Living people
Moroccan male middle-distance runners
Athletes (track and field) at the 2019 African Games
African Games competitors for Morocco
20th-century Moroccan people
21st-century Moroccan people